Zygaenosia is a genus of moths in the family Erebidae. The genus was erected by George Hampson in 1900.

Species
Zygaenosia basalis (Rothschild & Jordan, 1901)
Zygaenosia eximia Rothschild, 1936
Zygaenosia flavibasis (C. Swinhoe, 1892)
Zygaenosia flavonigra van Eecke, 1924
Zygaenosia fumosa (Rothschild, 1901)
Zygaenosia fuliginosa Rothschild, 1913
Zygaenosia fuscimarginalis (C. Swinhoe, 1892)
Zygaenosia immaculata (Rothschild & Jordan, 1901)
Zygaenosia klossi Rothschild, 1915
Zygaenosia medialis Gaede, 1925
Zygaenosia subhyalinifascia Rothschild, 1913

Former species
Zygaenosia melanoxantha (Hampson, 1914)
Zygaenosia truncata Rothschild, 1913

References

 
Nudariina
Moth genera